Outel Bono  (1934 – 26 August 1973) was a Chadian medical doctor and politician.

He was medical director of the hospital in Chad's capital, Fort-Lamy (now N'Djamena), in 1963 when he was arrested for plotting against the government of President François Tombalbaye. Condemned to death, his sentence was commuted after a vigorous campaign led by the French Communist Party. He was reprieved in 1965 and was able to resume his medical career.

In 1969 Bono was again arrested and condemned to forced labour; but Tombalbaye released him early and appointed him Director (i.e. chief civil servant) of the Chadian Health Ministry, until, in 1972, he left Chad and went to Paris, where he joined the exiled political opposition. He had organised a press conference to launch a new political party, the Mouvement Démocratique de Rénovation Tchadienne (MDRT), but two days before, on 26 August 1973, Outel Bono was assassinated in Paris. He was killed by two shots from a revolver as he climbed into his car.

The police investigation failed to find the culprit and the file was closed in 1982 by the investigating magistrate. There were suspicions that both the French secret service and the Chadian government were involved. A journalist identified the killer as a French agent who had previously worked for President Bokassa of the Central African Republic, a certain Jacques Bocquel, possibly through orders from Camille Gourvenec, a French aide of the President Tombalbaye. 

Outel Bono's French wife, Nadine, tried to have the case reopened but her appeal was rejected and she was forced to pay legal costs.

The case of Outel Bono has been cited as an example of the web of secret links between powerful people in France and its former African colonies, for which the author François-Xavier Verschave coined the term Françafrique in 1994.

References
François-Xavier Verschave, La Françafrique - Le plus long scandale de la République, Stock, pages 155-172

External links
The killing of Outel Bono 
Chad: Fall of the Tombalbaye Government

1934 births
1973 deaths
1973 murders in Europe
Deaths by firearm in France
Assassinated Chadian politicians
Chadian people murdered abroad
Chadian prisoners sentenced to death
Prisoners sentenced to death by Chad
People murdered in France
Chadian communists
People from N'Djamena